The proposition in probability theory known as the law of total expectation,  the law of iterated expectations (LIE), Adam's law, the tower rule,   and the smoothing theorem, among other names, states that if  is a random variable whose expected value  is defined, and  is any random variable on the same probability space, then

One special case states that if  is a finite or countable partition of the sample space, then

Note: The conditional expected value E(X | Z) is a random variable whose value depend on the value of Z.  Note that the conditional expected value of X given the event Z = z is a function of z.  If we write E(X | Z = z) = g(z) then the random variable E(X | Z) is g(Z). Similar comments apply to the conditional covariance.

Example
Suppose that only two factories supply light bulbs to the market. Factory 's bulbs work for an average of 5000 hours, whereas factory 's bulbs work for an average of 4000 hours. It is known that factory  supplies 60% of the total bulbs available. What is the expected length of time that a purchased bulb will work for?

Applying the law of total expectation, we have:

 

where
  is the expected life of the bulb;
  is the probability that the purchased bulb was manufactured by factory ;
  is the probability that the purchased bulb was manufactured by factory ;

Thus each purchased light bulb has an expected lifetime of 4600 hours.

Proof in the finite and countable cases
Assume that  is defined, i.e. . If  is a partition of the probability space , then

Proof.

If the series is finite, then we can switch the summations around, and the previous expression will become

In both scenarios, the above summations may be exchanged without affecting the sum.

Proof in the general case
Let  be a probability space on which two sub σ-algebras  are defined. For a random variable  on such a space, the smoothing law states that if  is defined, i.e.
, then

Proof. Since a conditional expectation is a Radon–Nikodym derivative, verifying the following two properties establishes the smoothing law:

 -measurable
  for all 

The first of these properties holds by definition of the conditional expectation. To prove the second one,

so the integral  is defined (not equal ).

The second property thus holds since
 implies

Corollary.

Alternative proof for 

This is a simple consequence of the measure-theoretic definition of conditional expectation.  By definition,  is a -measurable random variable that satisfies

for every measurable set . Taking  proves the claim.

Proof of partition formula

where  is the indicator function of the set .

If the partition  is finite, then, by linearity, the previous expression becomes

and we are done.

If, however, the partition  is infinite, then we use the dominated convergence theorem to show that

Indeed, for every ,

By initial assumption, . Applying the dominated convergence theorem yields the desired result.

See also
 The fundamental theorem of poker for one practical application.
 Law of total probability
 Law of total variance
 Law of total covariance
 Law of total cumulance
 Product distribution#expectation (application of the Law for proving that the product expectation is the product of expectations)

References

 (Theorem 34.4)
Christopher Sims, "Notes on Random Variables, Expectations, Probability Densities, and Martingales", especially equations (16) through (18)

Algebra of random variables
Theory of probability distributions
Statistical laws